Otto Magnus Ludwig Gerhard Graf von Moltke von Rantzau (13 August 1851 – 13 January 1881), also known as Otto von Moltke, was a German-Danish military officer who fought in the Franco-Prussian War in 1870 and, after emigrating to Chile in 1876, in the War of the Pacific in 1879. He was killed in battle in 1881, during this last war.

Moltke family

Otto von Moltke was part of the old noble Moltke family, originally from Mecklenburg, which had residents in Germany and Denmark. He was the son of Adam Friedrich Adamson Graf von Moltke (1816–1885) and Fanny Charlotte Anna Luise Gräfin zu Rantzau (1824–1866).  

He had six brothers; 
 Adam Karl Christian Graf von Moltke (1850–1892), emigrated to Chile with Otto in 1876 and married Delfina Natividad Winslow (1861–1926), with whom he had descendants in that country. 
 Friedrich Sophus Graf von Moltke (1853–1911) 
 Heinrich Karl Leonhard Graf von Moltke (1854–1922), was a vice admiral in the Imperial German Navy.
 Nancy Karoline Luise Gräfin von Moltke (1856–?)
 Marie Frederikke Malvine Elisabeth Fanny Gräfin von Moltke (1860–1915)
 Conrad Christian Ludwig Graf von Moltke (1861–1937)

He also had a half sister, from his father's second marriage to Agathe Frederikke Charlotte Olshausen (1834-1909);
 Stephanie Eleonore Adamine Gräfin von Moltke (1873–?)

His father, who was a Danish civil servant, prefect of one of the Danish provinces of the Duchy of Holstein until 1864, belongs to the same family as the Prussian military strategist Helmuth von Moltke (1800–1891).

Early life
Otto von Moltke was born on 13 August 1851 in Lauenburg, in the Duchy of Saxe-Lauenburg, Denmark. He was educated in the gymnasium of Lübeck together with his older brother Karl, after his father's change of residence to that city due to the Prussian annexation of the province he administered. In that compound he carried out his studies in the humanities, until he was old enough to be accepted as a soldier in the Prussian Army.

German military service
Otto enlisted in January 1869 in a Regiment Prussian Grenadiers at Altona. The following year he participated in the Franco-Prussian War, integrating the Prussian forces that carried out the campaigns in France that year. On 16 August he was present with his regiment at the Battle of Mars-la-Tour, a violent engagement in which a part of the Prussian Army successfully intercepted the French Army of the Rhine that was trying to reach Verdun, but at the cost of many casualties. In this bloody battle, Otto was wounded, while his chief, a colonel surnamed von Schöning, was killed. Due to his brave conduct in battle, Otto was promoted to standard-bearer and then, in September, to second lieutenant, also receiving the Iron Cross Second Class. Later he also received the War Commemorative Medal of 1870/71.

After the Franco-Prussian War, he continued his service in the Imperial German Army, with the same regiment. He was then assigned to work in the barracks and, in 1875, was promoted to lieutenant. But he soon resigned because of the boredom that the job in the barracks produced, his meagre salary and a certain irregularity in the compound.

Emigration to Chile

Work and social relationship
After his departure from the army, and with the aim of seeking a new life project, he associated with his brother Karl, who had also been in the army and had participated in the Franco-Prussian War. Both, informed of the good working conditions and the prosperity of Chile through the German consul in Hamburg, Mr. Schutte, decided to emigrate to that country. They arrived in Valparaíso in August 1876, via Cape Horn on the sailboat Adolphus.

Already in Chile, Otto and his brother joined the German residents, also made up of Danish. Soon he and his brother found a modest job in a sugar refinery of Viña del Mar, which belonged to the German businessman and resident Julio Bernstein. Otto lived for three years in Santiago, and in his free time he cultivated his social relationships with the affability and simplicity that endeared him to those who knew him. He dedicated himself in this free time to dancing, which was his great passion.

War of the Pacific and death
When hostilities began against Peru and Bolivia in early 1879, Otto obtained a leave of absence from his work to volunteer in the Chilean Army in the face of impending war. His brother Karl, meanwhile, took his place at the sugar refinery. Chilean Colonel Eckers assigned Otto the rank of second lieutenant in the Marine Artillery Regiment.

With his regiment he was in the occupation of Antofagasta and the rest of the ports of the Bolivian coast. Later, he was assigned to garrison with a company of his regiment a nitrate establishment in the area called "Toco". There he suffered an unfortunate accident, the result of an accidental shot from a revolver that pierced his liver from band to band. Due to the severity of the wound, he was transferred to Valparaíso to be treated by a doctor named von Shroeders, who managed to cure him.

Having recovered from his wound, he returned to the north to participate in the war. Otto embarked on the auxiliary cruiser Amazonas as commander of the military garrison on board. In October, during the naval campaign, he had the advantage of being one of the legal participants in the price of the capture of the Peruvian ironclad Húascar. Later Otto was reinstated to the Marine Artillery Regiment with the rank of lieutenant. He participated in the Battle of Pisagua and the Battle of Tarapacá, both in November, during the Campaign of Tarapacá, and the Battle of Tacna in May 1880, during the Campaign of Tacna–Arica. During the course of the latter, his regiment was one of the military units that decided the Chilean victory in the center of the battle line. 

Having observed his good performance in the land campaign, Colonel Domingo Toro Herrera, commander of the Regiment Chacabuco, requested that Moltke be transferred to his command and appointed him as his aide-de-camp with the rank of captain in his regiment. With his new regiment he prepared to fight in the Campaign of Lima. On 11 December, while in Pisco, he wrote a letter to his brother Karl about his good luck in the war and his impressions on the upcoming campaign for the Peruvian capital.

Subsequently, on 26 December, after the Chilean landing in Curayaco, south of Lima, Otto, while on board the auxiliary cruiser Angamos, wrote his last letter to his brother Karl, in which he said the following:

On 13 January 1881, Otto participated in the Battle of San Juan and Chorrillos, commanding the 4th Company of the 1st Battalion of the Regiment Chacabuco, which was part of the Amunátegui Brigade of the 1st Army Division in the battle, under Patricio Lynch. During the second phase of the battle, after Chilean forces captured the San Juan line, his regiment and the Regiment 4th Line were ordered to attack the strong Peruvian defences on the Morro Solar promontory. Otto did the same at the head of the company he commanded. In that place the Chilean forces were repelled with several casualties by the intense fire, having to retreat and abandon some trenches that they had managed to occupy in the face of the Peruvian counterattack. It was during this part of the battle that he was mortally wounded by a gunshot to the chest, and then his body was cruelly torn to pieces on the ground by Peruvian soldiers with rifle butts and knives.

In the aftermath of the battle, Morro Solar was occupied by Chilean troops, who recovered Moltke's remnants. His body was repatriated to Valparaíso under the special concern of the Bernstein family, and was later buried on 4 April in the port's dissidents cemetery. His funeral was carried out with an impressive night torch ceremony and a large attendance of authorities and institutions of the port. His father received a letter of condolence from the Chilean government.

It is said that Moltke possessed a limited command of the Spanish language, always referring to his military orderly as "the pogopi."

See also
 German immigration in Chile

Notes

References

Sources
 
 

1851 births
1881 deaths
Otto von Moltke
People from Lauenburg (Elbe)
Prussian Army personnel
19th-century German military personnel
German military personnel of the Franco-Prussian War
Military personnel of the War of the Pacific
Military personnel killed in the War of the Pacific
German emigrants to Chile
Military personnel from Schleswig-Holstein